Malcolm Clift (born 31 October 1936) is an Australian former rugby league footballer and former coach of Canterbury-Bankstown, Leeds and the Gold Coast Seagulls.

Background
Clift was born in Canterbury, New South Wales, Australia.

Career
Clift began his career at Canterbury-Bankstown as a center. In 1960 he had his last playing season, and started coaching. He coached Canterbury-Bankstown to the 1974 Grand Final, which the club lost against Eastern Suburbs. Clift stopped coaching for a period between 1977 and 1982. In 1985, he coached English side Leeds, but left after one season. 

Clift later coached the Gold Coast Seagulls . He retired in 1991 after coaching for one season at the Gold Coast.  That year, the club endured a horror year on the field, only winning two matches and finished last with the Wooden Spoon. 

After his retirement, Clift assisted Chris Anderson with his coaching term.

Sources
 Whiticker, Alan & Hudson, Glen (2006) The Encyclopedia of Rugby League Players, Gavin Allen Publishing, Sydney

References

1936 births
Living people
Australian rugby league players
Australian rugby league coaches
Canterbury-Bankstown Bulldogs coaches
Gold Coast Chargers coaches
Canterbury-Bankstown Bulldogs players
Leeds Rhinos players
Leeds Rhinos coaches
Rugby league players from Sydney